The 2003 Copa Sudamericana Finals was a two-legged football match, contested between Argentine club River Plate and Peruvian side Club Sportivo Cienciano to determine the champion of the 2003 Copa Sudamericana.

In the first leg, held in Estadio Monumental in Buenos Aires, both teams tied 3–3. In the second leg held in Estadio Universidad de San Agustín in Arequipa, Cienciano won 1–0 and therefore the Peruvian squad crowned champion of the competition after winning 4–1 on points (4–3 on aggregate).

Qualified teams

Route to the final

Match details

First leg

Second leg

References

2
Copa Sudamericana Finals
Copa Sudamericana Finals 2003
Copa Sudamericana Finals 2003
Copa Sudamericana Finals
Copa Sudamericana Finals